The Wing-and-Wing; Or, Le Feu-Follet is an 1842, sea novel by the American author James Fenimore Cooper. It includes a thematic interest in religiosity and faith. The novel also introduces metacriticism into Cooper's sea fiction, as does The Sea Lions, unlike earlier novels which typically also focused on nautical and nationalist themes.

References

Further reading
 (plot summary)

External links

Novels by James Fenimore Cooper
1842 American novels
Nautical novels